Sar Darreh-ye Bibi Roshteh (also Romanized as Sar Darreh-ye Bībī Roshteh; also known as Sar Darreh) is a village in Alqchin Rural District, in the Central District of Charam County, Kohgiluyeh and Boyer-Ahmad Province, Iran. At the 2006 census, its population was 76, in 14 families.

References 

Populated places in Charam County